Chamonix Hockey Club was a French ice hockey team based in Chamonix that last played in the Ligue Magnus in 2015. The team is also known as "Chamois de Chamonix" (Chamonix Chamois).

With 30 championship titles, Chamonix was the most successful French club in ice hockey.

The team was founded in 1910. In 2010, the club celebrated its 100th birthday.

In 2016, the team merged with Pingouins de Morzine-Avoriaz to form the Pionniers De Chamonix-Morzine.

Titles
French champion (30) : 1923, 1925, 1926, 1927, 1929, 1930, 1931, 1939, 1942, 1944, 1946, 1949, 1952, 1954, 1955, 1958, 1959, 1961, 1963, 1964, 1965, 1966, 1967, 1968, 1970, 1971, 1972, 1973, 1976, 1979

Former players

 Riku Silvennoinen 
 Juho Mielonen 
 Ilpo Salmivirta

 Clement Masson
 Lou Bogdanoff
 Jeremy Ares
 Clement Colombin
 Matthias Terrier 
 Jordan Mugnier
 Arnaud Hascoet 
 Damien Torfou 
 Jimmy Darier 
 Henri-Corentin Buysse 
 Joris Bedin 
 Patxi Biscard
 Florian Hardy

 Henric Andersen

Luc Tardif
 Pierre-Luc Lessard
 Randy Cameron 
 Dominic Jalbert 
 Matt Bissonnette
 Michael Beaudry 
 Julien Tremblay

Former coaches
 Alan Jacob

References

External links
 Official website 

Ice hockey teams in France
Sport in Haute-Savoie
Ice hockey clubs established in 1910
1910 establishments in France
Chamonix